This is a list of biographical films of Anne Frank, and film adaptations of her diaries.

References